Microsoft GIF Animator is a historical computer software program for Microsoft Windows to create simple animated GIF files based on the GIF89a file format. It was freely downloadable from the Microsoft Download Center but is now only available through MSDN and on third party download sites. It was also bundled with Microsoft Image Composer and Microsoft FrontPage.

Animations can be looped, spun, and faded in and out; users can set the size and transparency of images. Automatic and custom palette creation are supported.

See also 
 Microsoft Paint

References

Further reading

External links 
 How to animate GIFs with Microsoft GIF Animator

Raster graphics editors
Discontinued Microsoft software
Microsoft free software
Windows-only free software